The Aigle–Leysin railway line is a narrow-gauge railway line in the Chablais area of southwest Switzerland. The line was opened on 5 May 1900, a -gauge cog-wheel railway using the Abt rack system. It was the first such line in the region. The line was built by the Chemin de fer Aigle–Leysin.

Nowadays it is joined in Aigle's main railway station by express trains of the Swiss Federal Railways together with those of three other, local, narrow-gauge railways: the Aigle-Ollon-Monthey-Champéry Railway (AOMC), the Aigle–Leysin Railway and the Aigle-Sépey-Diablerets Railway (ASD).

History

 5 May 1900 : opening of the two kilometer long section Aigle JS station - Aigle Grand-Hôtel des Bains. The station Aigle JS of the Jura–Simplon Railways (JS) became the station Aigle CFF with the foundation of the Swiss Federal Railways in 1902, which is called Chemin de Fer Federaux Suisse (CFF) in the French-speaking part of the country. This section was laid out as a normal tramway used in adhesion operation. Due to 1:10 grade near the hotel, the tram had special emergency brakes system Réal, where in case of bad track conditions brake beams with claws could be lowered into oak beams embedded in the road along the tracks in case of an emergency. The tramway line was operated by three two-axle streetcars build by SIG and CIE.
 5 November 1900 : opening of the rack railway section Depot Aigle - Feydey (Leysin). The depot of the tramway was about half-way of the tramway line Aigle JS station - Aigle Grand-Hôtel des Bains on the other side of the river Grand Eau. The rack railway vehicles did not have ability to run with own force on the tramway, because they were only equipped with rack drive. Therefore, the tramway cars took the rack cars from the railway station to the depot, from where they ran on their own propulsion to Leysin. 
 1912 : The line between Leysin-Village et Leysin-Feydey is doubled
 September 1915 : Extension of the line to the current terminus at Leysin-Grand Hôtel.
 31.August 1932 : Tramway operation between Aigle Pont-de-la-Grande-Eau and the Grand-Hôtel des Bains was stopped due to economy crises. The hotel closed in 1934 and did not open after World War II. The hotel was knocked down in 1945 as well as the tramway line between the former station Aigle Pont-de-la-Grande-Eau and the terminus at the hotel. 
In 1946, the rolling stock was renewed. The three tramway cars used for the Aigle tramway were scrapped. The destination Aigle CFF-Leysin was operated by vehicles, which were able to operate on adhesion track as well as on rack railway track. Traction current voltage was raised from 650 to 1300 volts.  This allowed the journey time to be reduced to around 30 minutes.

The route
The first 1 km of the route is through the streets of Aigle from the railway station to the railway depot where the train reverses to enable the powered vehicle to be at the rear of the train for the uphill journey, normal working on a rack (cog-wheel) railway. From this point the line climbs steeply through the vineyards, the steepest gradient being 1 in 4.3 (23%).

The operating voltage of the line has changed four times, increasing from 600 V DC at opening, first to 650 V DC, then in 1946 to 1300 V DC, and later to the present operating voltage of 1500 V DC.

Mergers 
In 1975 the four local railway companies, Aigle–Leysin, Aigle–Ollon–Monthey–Champéry, Aigle–Sépey–Diablerets and Bex–Villars–Bretaye (BVB) merged to form a single operating company, known as the Transports Publics du Chablais (TPC). This brought about increased co-operation between the companies in the provision of community-based services.

Federal involvement 

In 1985, the Federal Government informed the Aigle–Leysin Railway, and other privately operated railways, that it would cease all funding the following year, however they renewed a federal concession for a further period of 50 years. An agreement was signed between the Canton of Vaud, the communities served by the railway and the Aigle–Leysin Railway and its partners to renew rolling stock and upgrade the track.

In the mid-1990s, faced with greatly increased operating costs, the Canton of Vaud and the communities served by the railway petitioned the Federal Government to revoke its 1985 decision. The Federal Government did so and in 1996, recognizing the importance of this regional line as a public transportation carrier, awarded the line with a contract to provide a public transportation service. This brought about, in 1999, talks which resulted in the founding, the following year, of Transports Publics du Chablais as the parent body of local public transportation with the four local railway companies as founding members.  The railway now operates as line A under the TPC banner.

Rolling stock 

, Transports Publics du Chablais rostered two locomotives, one kleinlokomotive, six railcars, five driving trailers, two goods wagons, and six utility vehicles for service on the Aigle–Leysin line.

References

Rack railways in Switzerland
Railway lines in Switzerland
Transports Publics du Chablais lines
Metre gauge railways in Switzerland
Mountain railways
Railway lines opened in 1900
Aigle
Leysin
Transport in the canton of Vaud
1500 V DC railway electrification